The Little Shepherd of Kingdom Come is a 1903 Kentucky Civil War novel by John Fox Jr. It was serialized in Scribner's Magazine in the summer of 1903, and the book edition published later that year.  The novel tells the rags-to-respectability tale of orphan Chad Buford. It was the first novel to sell a million copies in the US. Fox's depiction of black characters was held against it from the 1960s.

Film versions
The Little Shepherd of Kingdom Come, 1920 film 
The Little Shepherd of Kingdom Come, 1928 film
The Little Shepherd of Kingdom Come, 1961 film

See also
Kingdom Come State Park

References

1903 novels
Novels set in Kentucky
Novels set during the American Civil War